"Bart the Fink" is the fifteenth episode of the seventh season of the American animated television series The Simpsons. It originally aired on the Fox network in the United States on February 11, 1996. In this episode, Bart inadvertently exposes Krusty the Clown as one of the biggest tax cheats in American history. With his career ruined, Krusty fakes his suicide and adopts an alias, until Bart and Lisa convince him to become a television clown again.

The episode was written by John Swartzwelder and Bob Kushell, and directed by Jim Reardon. American actor Bob Newhart guest-starred in it as himself. The episode's title is a play on the 1991 film Barton Fink.

Since airing, the episode has received mostly positive reviews from television critics. It acquired a Nielsen rating of 8.7, and was the fifth-highest-rated show on the Fox network the week it aired.

Plot
After the death of great-aunt Hortense, the Simpson family attends the reading of her will. After each family member receives $100, Marge has Bart and Lisa open bank accounts to teach them fiscal responsibility. Bart is excited with his new checking account and writes checks for his friends.

To obtain Krusty the Clown's autograph, Bart slips a check into Krusty's pocket, figuring that he will receive an endorsed copy of it with his monthly bank statement. When Bart receives the check, it is endorsed with a stamp instead of a signature. Dismayed, Bart brings the check to the bank, hoping to force Krusty to sign it. A suspicious bank teller notices the Cayman Islands holding corporation on Krusty's stamp and investigates; soon Krusty is exposed as one of the biggest tax cheats in American history.

The IRS takes control of Krusty's assets and his show, reducing his lavish lifestyle while auctioning off most of his possessions. A depressed Krusty crashes his airplane into a mountainside and is pronounced dead, devastating Bart. After Krusty's funeral, however, Bart sees a Krusty look-alike about town and realizes he may still be alive. With Lisa's help, he learns that Krusty has disguised himself as Rory B. Bellows, a grizzled longshoreman. Bart and Lisa convince him to return to his former life as Krusty, whom they insist is more respected than teachers and scientists. Krusty kills off his alias in a "boating accident" to collect the life insurance, thus ending his tax woes.

Production

"Bart the Fink" was written by John Swartzwelder, but Bob Kushell came up with the idea for it. The episode was based on the "big tax problems" that some celebrities, such as country singer Willie Nelson, had at the time. The idea of Krusty faking his own death was an idea the production team had wanted to do for a long time, and it was inspired by the rumors that American actor Andy Kaufman had faked his death. Bill Oakley and Josh Weinstein, the showrunners of seasons seven and eight of The Simpsons, came up with the beginning of the episode in which the family spends the night in a haunted house as the epitome of "the cruddiest beginning of any cruddy thing", but with the comedic twist that the family did not encounter any ghosts in the house and had their "best night's sleep ever". A similar joke (riffing on the clichéd nature of the setup) was used in the season 5 episode, Homer Loves Flanders, with both episodes sharing the same haunted house model.

The episode was directed by Jim Reardon. Consultant David Mirkin suggested that the animators should add "some funny things" to the episode to "spice it up", such as the gorilla suit that one of the bank employees wear. After the audio recording of the script by the cast, the episode ended up being too long. Weinstein said one of the reasons for it was that Krusty talks very slowly, which drags out the time. They were only allowed to send twenty minutes' worth of audio to Film Roman for them to animate, but the audio track for the episode was twenty-six minutes long. American actor Bob Newhart guest-starred in the episode as himself. Oakley said Newhart also talked very slowly, and they had to cut out more than half of his recorded lines. Many of the writers were big fans of Newhart and everybody wanted to see him record his lines. Oakley and Weinstein decided to shut down production so that the whole writing staff could go to the recording studio. The episode was recorded in a large room, which required everybody there to be very quiet. It took Newhart two and a half minutes to record his first take, and, as no one was allowed to laugh during that time, there was an "explosion" of laughter in the room when he finished. Parts of Phil Hartman's appearance as Troy McClure were also cut from the episode due to time limits.

Cultural references
The episode's title is a play on the 1991 film Barton Fink. After losing his show and money, Krusty takes the bus home. An advertisement on the bus reads "Are you missing Mad About You right now? NBC Must See TV Sundays at 8 p.m." Krusty's airplane, "I'm-on-a-rolla-Gay", is a spoof of the Enola Gay B-29 airplane that dropped the atomic bomb on the Japanese city Hiroshima in World War II.

Krusty's illegal Cayman Islands "accountant" is modeled on the actor Sydney Greenstreet, particularly on his role in the film Casablanca. Swartzwelder is seen attending Krusty's funeral, while wearing a Kermit the Frog puppet on his hand.

Reception
In its original broadcast, "Bart the Fink" finished sixty-fourth in the ratings for the week of February 5–11, 1996, with a Nielsen rating of 8.7. The episode was the fifth highest-rated show on the Fox network that week, following Melrose Place, The X-Files, Beverly Hills, 90210, and Married... with Children.

"Bart the Fink" received generally positive reviews from television critics. DVD Movie Guide's Colin Jacobson called the episode a "winner" and praised it for the "one hundred tacos for $100" joke. Jennifer Malkowski of DVD Verdict said that the best part of the episode is when Homer comforts Bart after Krusty's death by assuring him that he, too, could wake up dead tomorrow.

In the book I Can't Believe It's a Bigger and Better Unofficial Simpsons Guide by Warren Martyn and Adrian Wood, they comment that "Bart the Fink" is "very fast and very good, with plenty of gags and effective set pieces. Bob Newhart's eulogy to Krusty is especially memorable." The authors of Media, home, and family, Stewart Hoover, Lynn Schofield Clark, and Diane Alters wrote that "Krusty ultimately expertly proves the truth about the IRS: ruining the financial and emotional life of many [people]."

William Irwin, author of The Simpsons and Philosophy: The D'oh! of Homer, also praised the use of IRS in "Bart the Fink" to convey the message that "none of us can escape the unavoidable taxes". In addition, Chris Turner claims "Bart the Fink" offers a "pointed answer to the question of why such a manifestly miserable world of phonies and cheats would be so enticing to many".

References

Bibliography

External links

The Simpsons (season 7) episodes
1996 American television episodes
Television shows written by John Swartzwelder
Television episodes about funerals